Joanne G. Emmons (February 8, 1934 – March 31, 2022) was a Republican member of both houses of the Michigan Legislature from 1987 until 1999.

Biography
Born February 8, 1934, to Ray and Emma Gregory in Big Rapids, Emmons married her husband John in 1956. She was the valedictorian of her class at Mecosta High School in 1952 and graduated from Michigan State University in 1956 with a degree in home economics. She taught that subject at her high school alma mater from 1956 until 1958.

In 1976, Emmons was elected treasurer of Big Rapids Township, a position she held for 10 years, as well as chair of the Mecosta County Republican Party, where she served until 1980.  From 1981 to 1986, Emmons was a member of the Michigan Townships Association Board of Directors, and was also on the board of the Michigan Municipal Treasurers Association for two years.

She served two terms in the Michigan House of Representatives, from 1987 until 1990, and three terms in the Senate. She served as majority floor leader of the Senate during the 91st Legislature.

Emmons was involved with a number of community organizations, including the Central Michigan Mental Health Board, the Area Agency on Aging Advisory Board, the Pleasant View Farm Bureau Discussion Group, the Lutheran Child and Family Services Board of Directors. She was a member of Kappa Omicron Nu.

She was an unsuccessful candidate for the Michigan State University Board of Trustees in 2002. Emmons died on March 31, 2022, at the age of 88.

Emmons was not related to State Senator Judy Emmons.

References

External links

1934 births
2022 deaths
20th-century American women politicians
20th-century American politicians
21st-century American women politicians
21st-century American politicians
People from Big Rapids, Michigan
Michigan State University alumni
Women state legislators in Michigan
Republican Party members of the Michigan House of Representatives
Republican Party Michigan state senators